The Toba Achakzai or Khwaja Amran is an offshoot of the Toba Kakar range of mountains, north of Chaman, in Balochistan, Pakistan, extending into Maruf District in Kandahar Province, Afghanistan. It is crossed by N-25 National Highway and Rohri–Chaman Railway Line that passes through the Khojak railway tunnel. The grave of Khwaja Amran Baba is located at the peak.

The area is located within the heartland of the Achakzai tribe of Durrani Pashtuns. Ahmad Shah Durrani, the founder of Afghanistan, used to pass some of the hot weeks in summer in the pleasant weather of Toba Achakzai.

See also
 Khojak Pass
Toba Kakar
List of mountains in Pakistan

References

External links
Location of the Amran Range

Mountain ranges of Balochistan (Pakistan)